Breskul is a  peak located in the Chornohora (Чорногора) mountain range of Carpathian  Mountains in west Ukraine. It is situated on the border of Ivano-Frankivsk and Zakarpattia Oblasts, between the mountains Hoverla and Pozhyzhevska. Breskul is Hoverla's closest neighbor.

The top of the mountain is domed, on the northern slope (Breskulets spur) steep scree. In several places, the slopes are cut by the punishments of ancient glaciation. Covered with alpine and subalpine vegetation (grasses, flowers and shrubs), erosion is developing.

References

Mountains of the Eastern Carpathians
One-thousanders of Ukraine
Geography of Ivano-Frankivsk Oblast
Geography of Zakarpattia Oblast